Distington is a large village and civil parish in Cumbria, England,  south of Workington and  north of Whitehaven. Historically a part of Cumberland, the civil parish includes the nearby settlements of Common End, Gilgarran and Pica. The parish had a population of 2,247 in the 2001 census, increasing slightly to 2,256 at the 2011 census.

South of the village by the Lowca Beck are the fragmentary remains of Hayes Castle, a manor house fortified by Robert de Leyburn in 1322.

Governance
Distington is in the parliamentary constituency of Copeland, Trudy Harrison is the Member of parliament.

For Local Government purposes it is in the Distington, Lowca & Parton Ward of Borough of Copeland and the Howgate Ward of Cumbria County Council.

The village also has its own Parish Council; Distington Parish Council. The parish council ward stretches beyond the confines of Distington parish with at total population taken at the Census 2011 of 4,058.

Transport

The main road through Distington is the A595. There was once a railway station at Distington on the Cleator and Workington Junction Railway which was an important junction.

Today Harrington railway station, on the Cumbria Coast Line, is the nearest operational station.

See also

Listed buildings in Distington
Distington railway station

References

External links
Cumbria County History Trust: Distington (nb: provisional research only – see Talk page)

Villages in Cumbria
Civil parishes in Cumbria
Borough of Copeland